Kismet, also known as Paragon, Her, and Ayesha, is a fictional character appearing in American comic books published by Marvel Comics. She exists in Marvel's main shared universe, known as the Marvel Universe.

Ayesha appeared in the Marvel Cinematic Universe film Guardians of the Galaxy Vol. 2, portrayed by Elizabeth Debicki.

Publication history

The character first appeared as Paragon in The Incredible Hulk vol. 2 Annual #6 and was created by Len Wein, David Kraft, and Herb Trimpe. She first appeared as Her and Kismet in Marvel Two-in-One #61, while Ayesha first appeared in Fantastic Four vol. 3 #11.

Fictional character biography
Originally known as Paragon, Kismet was the second attempt by the Enclave to artificially create a super-powerful being in their Citadel of Science "the Beehive" (their first attempt was Him, later known as Adam Warlock). The Enclave intended to create a super-powerful being to control. "Born" before being fully formed, Paragon appeared as a muscular male figure. Paragon battled the Hulk, then overrode the Enclave's control and sunk their Beehive headquarters before incubating itself in a cocoon much like Warlock often would.

She later emerged from the cocoon in her blond-haired, golden-skinned form wearing red swimsuit-like attire. As a female replicant of Warlock, she took the name of Her (a reference to Warlock's original name, Him) and sought Warlock to mate with him. However, Warlock had died some years earlier, traveling a short time into the future to steal his own soul with his Soul Gem in a twisted suicide. Confident she would be able to revive him, Her managed to restore and reanimate his body, but with his mind and soul missing, she was forced to sadly return him to his grave. She set out to explore the cosmos to find a possible mate.

She helped the ecologically ravaged planet U'sr'pr recover, invoking the wrath of the Consortium. She was called by the natives J'ridia Starduster. Later, she was aided by Alpha Flight and the Avengers against the Consortium.

Some time after beginning her quest to find Warlock, she discovered that Warlock had been resurrected body and soul. However, he rejects her, leaving her sobbing on the ground. After this, she held a competition among some of the most powerful men on Earth, attaching reproductive pods to their necks to see how they would react. She selected Quasar, Hercules, Wonder Man, Hyperion, Doc Samson, and Forgotten One for this task. She battled Quasar and was attacked by Jack of Hearts, but was saved by Quasar from Moondragon. As Quasar was the only one who did not destroy his pod, she turns her attentions to him for a time, until his girlfriend Kayla Ballantine (in possession of the Star Brand) severely beat her and forced her to return to cocoon form to heal. However, she decided to become Quasar's companion for a time.

In the 1992 storyline "Operation: Galactic Storm", she helps Quasar and willingly guards the Star Gates that threaten Earth's existence. She soon becomes involved in a fight with Binary, and also the Super-Skrull. Soon after the war, she became engulfed by the Soul-Eater and was rescued by Quasar.

During her adventures with Quasar she took the name Kismet, after the Arabic word for fate. She battled the Black Fleet destroying the planet Scadam. She later came to the rescue of her three creators in the Beehive. By healing them in cocoons similar to her own, they became golden skinned superhumans as well. The four of them journeyed into space.

Later still, she changed her name again, to Ayesha. During this time, she was under the control of the supervillain Crucible on Genosha.

Powers and abilities
Kismet is an artificial being created through genetic engineering by the Enclave. She has the ability to tap, store, and manipulate cosmic energy for a variety of effects, including the projection of concussive force bolts and flight. The cosmic energy enhances her physical attributes to superhuman levels, and enhances her metabolism and her life force, preventing her from aging, and making her virtually immortal. She can recover from serious injuries by creating a cosmic energy cocoon from surrounding molecules in which she can rest and regenerate. She can reanimate dead tissue by projecting a portion of her cosmic life force into it. Kismet cannot restore a being's spirit (astral self) to a body that she resurrects if that spirit has left the body. She also has the ability to use cosmic energy to rearrange molecular structures (of about three cubic feet at a time).

Other versions

Earth X

In the limited series Earth X, Mar-Vell is reincarnated as the child of the synthetic Adam Warlock/Him and Kismet/Her.

Fantastic Four: The End

In the limited series Fantastic Four: The End, Kismet (under the name of Ayesha) has apparently taken over the Captain Marvel mantle in the not-too-distant future.

Guardians of the Galaxy

Stakar Vaughn, Starhawk, was born to the superheroes Quasar and Kismet in the Guardians of the Galaxy alternate timeline (Earth-691) around the year 2002. Stakar is instantly stolen by Era, the evil child of Eon, and raised by friendly aliens. Kismet retreats to a monastery for hundreds of years, where she vows not to use her powers. Stakar, a grown adult, finds her. Together, they visit Quasar's grave. It is learned, through Era and the Hawk-God Stakar worships, that Quasar had been purposely sent to his death and Eon himself had been entrapped. Kismet and Stakar dedicate themselves to hunting down Era.

In other media

Film

 A variation of Ayesha appears in the Marvel Cinematic Universe (MCU) film Guardians of the Galaxy Vol. 2, portrayed by Elizabeth Debicki. This version is the high priestess of the golden-skinned Sovereign race. In a mid-credit scene, she observes the cocoon of a new member of the Sovereign and names him Adam.
 Ayesha will appear in the upcoming MCU film Guardians of the Galaxy Vol. 3, portrayed again by Elizabeth Debicki.

Video games
A hybridized incarnation of Ayesha appears as a playable character in Lego Marvel Super Heroes 2, voiced by Olivia Mace. This version has the appearance and attitude of her film incarnation coupled with the abilities and origin of her comic book counterpart.

References

External links
 
 Kismet at the Marvel Universe
 
 

Characters created by David Anthony Kraft
Characters created by Herb Trimpe
Characters created by Len Wein
Comics characters introduced in 1977
Fictional genetically engineered characters
Guardians of the Galaxy characters
Marvel Comics characters with accelerated healing
Marvel Comics characters with superhuman strength
Marvel Comics female superheroes
Fiction about resurrection